Boris Georgiev Nikolov (10 March 1929 – 29 January 2017) was a Bulgarian boxer from Dobrich.

Nikolov was the first Bulgarian ever to win a medal at the Olympics. He competed for Bulgaria in boxing in the 1952 Summer Olympics held in Helsinki, Finland in the middleweight event where he finished in third place and took a Bronze medal. He also competed at the 1956 Olympics as a light middleweight but did not win a medal.
 
In 2010 he was awarded the Stara Planina Order 1st class.

1956 Olympic results
Below is the record of Boris Nikolov, a Bulgarian light middleweight boxer who competed at the 1956 Melbourne Olympics:

 Round of 16: defeated Muhammad Saftar (Pakistan) on points
 Quarterfinal: lost to Zbigniew Pietrzykowski (Poland) on points

References

External links
Sports-reference

1929 births
2017 deaths
Olympic boxers of Bulgaria
Olympic bronze medalists for Bulgaria
Boxers at the 1952 Summer Olympics
Boxers at the 1956 Summer Olympics
Olympic medalists in boxing
Bulgarian male boxers
Medalists at the 1952 Summer Olympics
People from Dobrich
Middleweight boxers